|relegated       =
|promoted        =
|topscorer       = 
|sponsor         = 
|previous        = 2020
|next            = 2022
}}

The 2021 Connacht Senior Football Championship was the 2021 iteration of the Connacht Senior Football Championship organised by Connacht GAA.

Teams
The 2021 Connacht championship was contested by the five counties in the Irish province of Connacht. London and New York were withdrawn from the 2020 and 2021 Connacht championships as part of the impact of the COVID-19 pandemic on Gaelic games, due to international travel restrictions. There was a full open draw for the first time in more than 40 years. It took place on 19 April 2021. Sligo withdrew from the championship in 2020 but returned in 2021. London and New York returned in 2022 but games for 2021 not expected to take place until 2026.

Cancelled Games

 
|* = Due to the COVID-19 pandemic, on 11 December 2020, the GAA decided to cancel Roscommon hosting New York, On 8 April 2021, Mayo cancelled hosting London. They were both back for the 2022 campaign.

Bracket

Quarter-finals
Two counties were randomly drawn to face each other in the quarter-finals. The lowest ranked county to play in the quarter-finals was Sligo of Division 4.

Semi-finals
Three counties were given a bye to this stage and were joined by the winning team from quarter-final. The lowest ranked county to play in the semi-finals was Leitrim of Division 4.

Final

Mayo qualified for the 2021 All-Ireland SFC semi-finals.

See also
 2021 All-Ireland Senior Football Championship
 2021 Leinster Senior Football Championship
 2021 Munster Senior Football Championship
 2021 Ulster Senior Football Championship
 Impact of the COVID-19 pandemic on Gaelic games

References

2C
Connacht Senior Football Championship